Dindori Assembly constituency is one of the 230 Vidhan Sabha (Legislative Assembly) constituencies of Madhya Pradesh state in central India. It is part of Dindori District, and a segment of Mandla (Lok Sabha constituency).

Members of Legislative Assembly

As from a constituency of Madhya Bharat
 1951: Dwarikaprasad Anantram, Indian National Congress

As a constituency of Madhya Pradesh

See also
 Dindori, Madhya Pradesh

References

Assembly constituencies of Madhya Pradesh